Faramarz Sedighi (born 1949) is an Iranian actor and assistant director. He is a theater graduate of the Faculty of Fine Arts, University of Tehran. Seddighi started his professional career in 1969 with acting in "Rostam and Sohrab" theaters. He experienced his cinematic activity in 1972 with his role in the film "Cheshmeh" (Fountain) directed by Arbi Evansian. He became famous with his film "Naked to Noon with Speed" (1972) and his outstanding works include Snake Fang (1989) and "Blade and Silk" (1985).

‌‌Biography 

Faramarz Seddighi lived and studied in Saqqez until he was 17, when he moved to Tehran after being accepted to the University of Tehran in 1967 when he was 18 years old. He starred in several movies before the Iranian revolution in 1979. The film "The Virgin Woman" was one of the famous films in 1973, which starred alongside Morteza Aghili and Mehdi Fakhimzadeh. After the revolution in 1980, he made his first film. The film "Said all three of them", directed by Gholam-Ali Erfan, were his first professional activities after the revolution and played alongside Saeed Amir Soleimani, Jamshid Mashayekhi and Homayoun Asadian. His other films include Snake Fang, "The Last Flight", Love-stricken, and "The Prosecutor". Sedighi started working as a theater teacher before the Iranian revolution, and one of his most famous students was Mehraneh Mahin Torabi
In 1992, Faramarz Sedighi made a screenplay and directed the movie "The Bait" with the presence of Jamshid Hashempour and Reza Rooygari. The last film in which this actor played a role is "Khak va Atash" (Soil and fire), produced in 2010. According to some of his colleagues, Seddighi chose to withdraw in the 1990s, and according to Parviz Parastui, who first published Sedieghi's controversial photo, he did not even open his home door on the production  cast when they followed him for the 2016 film "The Domestic Killer", directed by Masoud Kimiai
According to his relatives explanations, Faramarz Siddiqui has developed Alzheimer's disease in recent years.

Filmography

MoviesDelshodegan Movie, 3continents, 2022

TV Series

References

External links 
International film guid, the University of Michigan, 1988, page 232
Iranian Cinema and the Islamic Revolution, Shahla Mirbakhtyar, 2015, page 86
Animating Eroded Landscapes: The Cinema of Ali Hatami, Ramin S Khanjani, 2014, page 47
Le cinéma iranien: l'image d'une société en bouillonnement : ..., Hormoz K, 1999, page 295
Variety International Film Guide, The university of Michigan, 1993, page 219
International Film Festival of India '92, Bangalore, January 10–20, 1992, page 78
Cinemaya: The Asian Film Magazine – Issues 15-21, Idiana University, 1992, Page 11
Iranian Cinema, 1985–1988, Fardin Press House, Page 32
  in wikipedia

1949 births
Living people
20th-century Iranian male actors
Iranian male film actors
People from Saghez
People from Tehran
Iranian male stage actors
Male actors from Tehran
Iranian male television actors
21st-century Iranian male actors
Recipients of the Order of Culture and Art
Iranian Science and Culture Hall of Fame recipients in Cinema
Crystal Simorgh for Best Actor winners